Eugene Reynolds Blumenthal (April 4, 1923 – February 3, 2020) was an American screenwriter, director, producer, and actor. He was one of the developers and producers of the TV series M*A*S*H.

Early life
Reynolds was born on April 4, 1923, to Frank Eugene Blumenthal, a businessman and entrepreneur, and Maude Evelyn (Schwab) Blumenthal, a model, in Cleveland, Ohio.  Reynolds initially was raised in Detroit, before the family relocated to Los Angeles in 1934.

Reynolds served in the United States Navy during World War II.  He served on ships including a destroyer-minesweeper the USS Zane. Following the war, Reynolds received a degree in history at the University of California, Los Angeles, and resumed his acting career.

Career

Acting 
Reynolds made his screen debut in the 1934 Our Gang short Washee Ironee, and for the next three decades made numerous appearances in films such as Captains Courageous (1937), Love Finds Andy Hardy (1938), Boys Town (1938), They Shall Have Music (1939), Santa Fe Trail (1940), Adventure in Washington (1941), Eagle Squadron (1942) and The Country Girl (1954) and on television series like I Love Lucy, Armstrong Circle Theatre, Whirlybirds, and Hallmark Hall of Fame. He was contracted to MGM between 1937 and 1940.

As a child actor, Reynolds often played the young version of the film's star character.  He did this for Ricardo Cortez  in 1937's The Californian, Tyrone Power in In Old Chicago (1938), James Stewart in 1938's Of Human Hearts and Don Ameche in Sins of Man (1936).

Directing and writing 
Following his return to acting after serving in World War II, Reynolds became frustrated with not being able to land leading roles and the general progress of his career, and turned to directing, shooting episodes of shows such as Leave It to Beaver, The Andy Griffith Show, and My Three Sons.

In 1957, Reynolds joined forces with Frank Gruber and James Brooks to create Tales of Wells Fargo for NBC. During the program's five-year run he wrote and directed numerous episodes.

Reynolds' additional directing credits include multiple episodes of  The Farmer's Daughter, F Troop, Hogan's Heroes, and Many Happy Returns.  He was the Executive Producer for Room 222, a breakthrough comedy-drama on the ABC network which was about an African American school teacher, and which dealt with subjects such as drugs, prejudice and dropping out of school. The series ran for over 100 episodes, some of which Reynolds directed. ABC released Reynolds from the show when it thought making the show funnier would result in higher ratings.

As a writer, director, and producer, Reynolds was involved with two highly successful CBS series in the 1970s and early 1980s. Between 1972 and 1983, he produced 120 episodes of M*A*S*H, which he co-created with Larry Gelbart, and for which he also wrote 11 episodes and directed 24. During that same period, he produced 22 episodes of Lou Grant, for which he wrote (or co-wrote) five episodes and directed 11.

Reynolds has been nominated for twenty-four Emmy Awards and won six times, including Outstanding Comedy Series for M*A*S*H and Outstanding Drama Series twice for Lou Grant, which also earned him a Humanitas Prize. He won the Directors Guild of America Award for Outstanding Direction of a Comedy Series twice for his work on M*A*S*H and the Directors Guild of America Award for Outstanding Direction of a Drama Series once for his work on Lou Grant.

Reynolds was elected President of the Directors Guild of America in 1993, a position he held until 1997.

Personal life
Reynolds was married to actress-turned-author Bonnie Jones, who appeared in five episodes of M*A*S*H as Lt. Barbara Bannerman, from 1972 until 1975, when the couple divorced. He and his second wife, actress Ann Sweeny, who also appeared on M*A*S*H as Nurse Carrie Donovan in the episode "Hanky Panky", married in 1979 and have one son.

Reynolds died at the age of 96 of heart failure on February 3, 2020, at Providence St. Joseph Medical Center in Burbank, California.

Filmography

Source:

References
Notes

Bibliography

 Holmstrom, John (1996). The Moving Picture Boy: An International Encyclopaedia from 1895 to 1995. Norwich: Michael Russell, p. 116.

External links

 
 Who's Who at MGM — Gene Reynolds (1939)
 Gene Reynolds at Find a Grave

1923 births
2020 deaths
20th-century American male actors
United States Navy personnel of World War II
American male child actors
American male film actors
American male radio actors
American male television actors
American television directors
Television producers from Ohio
American television writers
Burials at Forest Lawn Memorial Park (Glendale)
Directors Guild of America Award winners
Male actors from Cleveland
Male actors from Detroit
American male television writers
Military personnel from Cleveland
Metro-Goldwyn-Mayer contract players
Presidents of the Directors Guild of America
Primetime Emmy Award winners
Screenwriters from Michigan
Screenwriters from Ohio
Writers Guild of America Award winners